The Minister of Transport and Public Works (Spanish: Ministro de Transporte y Obras Públicas) is the head of the Ministry of Transport and Public Works and a member of the Cabinet of Uruguay. The current Minister is Luis Alberto Héber of the National Party (PN) who has been in office since 1 March 2020.

List of Ministers of Transport and Public Works

External links
 Uruguayan Ministers of Transport and Public Works (in Spanish only)

 
Transport and Public Works
Transport ministers
Public works ministers
Transport in Uruguay
Ministers
1891 establishments in Uruguay